Ursus Breweries, a subsidiary of Asahi Breweries Europe Ltd., is a Romanian beer producer. The company is based in Bucharest and owns 3 breweries in Timișoara, Buzău and Brașov as well as a craft mini-brewery in Cluj-Napoca and employs around 1,400 people. Ursus Breweries’ brands are: Ursus, Timișoreana, Ciucaș, Grolsch, Peroni Nastro Azzurro, Redd's, Stejar, Azuga, Pilsner Urquell, St. Stefanus and cider brand Kingswood.

The company was owned by SABMiller from 1996 until March 2017, and by Asahi Breweries Europe Ltd since March 2017.

History
In 1996, the South African Breweries purchased Vulturul Buzau. A year later, South African Breweries acquired Pitber Pitesti and Ursus S.A. Cluj-Napoca. In 2001, Ursus S.A. bought the majority stake of Timisoreana Beer S.A. In 2002, Ursus S.A. and Timisoreana SA merged into a single integrated company, named Romania Beer Company S.A. In 2004, SABMiller plc (formerly named South African Breweries) acquired the majority stake of Aurora Brasov, a company that merged in the same year with Romania Beer Company S.A. A year later, in 2005, the new name of SABMiller's operations in Romania becomes Ursus Breweries.

In 2014, Igor Tikhonov was appointed CEO of Ursus Breweries.

On the 31st of March, 2017 Asahi Group Holdings Ltd. has completed the purchase of Ursus Breweries in a transaction that included the former SABMiller Central and Eastern European businesses and brands. Its CEO stated that the acquisition would not change Ursus Breweries' line of business.

Breweries

Cluj–Napoca Craft Mini-Brewery: The modern history of the Cluj-Napoca brewery, which has a bear as its emblem, started in 1878. On 7 July 2011, the old brewery was replaced by a craft Mini-Brewery. The brewery is open to the public. The craft Mini-Brewery is actually named "Fabrica de Bere Ursus".
Timișoara Brewery: Established in 1718 at the initiative of the Austrian authorities ruled by Prince Eugene of Savoy. The brewery provided beer in a town that did not have drinkable water. The Timișoara brewery introduced the beer filter in 1920 in Romania, and aluminum kegs (instead of wooden kegs) in 1968.
Brașov Brewery: In 1892, Friedrich Czell & Sons Corporation acquired the Darste distilling plant and built a new brewery. In 1922, Alexandru Petit wrote in the Brasov's Monograph about the increased manpower of 130 employees and a rise in the annual beer and malt productivity to 40.000 hl and 80-90 wagons respectively. Following the nationalization in 1948, the Darste brewery and alcohol plant changed its name into "Aurora". In 1995, S.C. Aurora S.A. became a private company with 100% Romanian private capital. 
Buzău Brewery: The brewery in Buzau became operational in 1978 and had a production capacity of 500,000 hl/year. In 1991 the company became a joint-stock company and changed its name into S.C. "Vulturul S.A." Buzau and in 1996 the brewery was purchased by the South African Breweries. Ursus Breweries started two investment projects in 2005 with a total value of EUR 50 million for the expansion and development of the brewery.  The investment project was completed in 2009, the last investment stage being of EUR 42 million.

Brands

Ursus Premium, Ursus Fără Alcool, Ursus Nefiltrată, Ursus La Tank, Ursus Retro Carpatin, Ursus Black Grizly, Ursus Cherry Lager Cireșar, Pale Ale Panda, Ursus Cooler Cireșe, Ursus Cooler Grepfrut, Ursus Cooler Lămâie, Ursus Cooler Mango și Lime
Timișoreana, Timișoreana Nepasteurizată
Ciucaș, Ciucas Malzbier 
Stejar
Azuga Nepasteurizată
Peroni Nastro Azzurro
Grolsch, Grolsch Weizen
Redd's
Pilsner Urquell
Efes, Efes Draft
St. Stefanus

See also
Asahi Breweries
Beer in Romania

References

External links
 Official website

Beer in Romania
Companies based in Cluj-Napoca
Food and drink companies established in 1878
Privatized companies in Romania
Asahi Breweries
SABMiller
Romanian brands